John Pozzobon (in Portuguese João Pozzobon, 12 December 1904 – 27 June 1985) was a Catholic permanent deacon and the starter of the Schoenstatt's Pilgrim Mother Campaign (also known as the Rosary Campaign), today present in more than 100 countries in the world. His beatification process is ongoing.

Life

Childhood 
A son of Italian immigrants established in Southern Brazil, John was born in São João do Polêsine to simple and pious peasant family, that prayed the Rosary every evening. The third of nine brothers, when he was 10 years old he says to his father that he would like to become a Catholic priest. For that reason, he goes to study in the Pallotines seminary in Vale Vêneto, not far from his hometown.

After some 10 months there, he decides to return to his home, because of his poor physical health. At 14, he begins to have serious sight problems, so he could not continue his school studies. For the same reason, he was not deemed fit for military service.

Years later, John will say about his health: "God, in his infinite goodness, did not deem me incapable. He employed me as such I am and entrusted me to his Mother for the Campaign of the Holy Rosary. No one is unable to serve God."

Husband and father 

He marries at the age of 23 and has two children, but at 28 his wife dies. He had moved to the city of Santa Maria during the illness of his wife. It is in this city that, at 32 and with two young children, he forms a new household by marrying Victoria Filipetto, with whom he has five other children. He quits his occupation of peasant to open a small shop in the front part of his house. He becomes very respected by the people of his town, especially thanks to his honesty. He said: "I could be a rich man, but I applied only the legitimate profit margin; you can't get what belongs to others." This practice was very different from that of other traders at the time, who sold goods by twice the price they were purchased.

The first contacts with Schoenstatt 
It is in 1947 that his life crosses the path of the Schoenstatt Movement. He begins his journey of spiritual formation with the Schoenstatt Sisters of Mary and Father Celestino Trevisan. He participates in the blessing of the foundation stone of the Schoenstatt Shrine in Santa Maria. In this ceremony is present Fr. Joseph Kentenich, founder of Schoenstatt. This fact will mark him forever: "I felt like a little pupil of Father Kentenich," said Pozzobon later. "Since when I was twelve I felt a void, a lack of something I did not understand. But from that time, I discovered that it was the lack of God and His Mother."
John sealed his Covenant of Love with Mary on 11 April 1948, the day of the blessing and inauguration of the Shrine in Santa Maria.

The beginnings of the Pilgrim Mother Campaign 
In 1950, Pope Pius XII had called a Holy Year for the Church. On 1 November of that year would see the proclamation of the dogma of the Assumption of the Blessed Virgin Mary.

In September, John had attended, with a hundred men, a series of spiritual exercises that Father Celestino Trevisan had given with Sister Teresinha Gobbo. They discussed the importance of praying the Rosary and how to stimulate a prayer crusade in the families. On 10 September 1950, a replica of the Mater Ter Admirabilis picture, present in the Schoenstatt Shrine is blessed and entrusted to John Pozzobon for that he goes to pray the Rosary with the image in families.

"In that moment, I understood that the goodness and mercy of God and the Mother and Queen had given me a great evangelizing mission: the Holy Rosary Campaign." He is convinced that "when something comes from God, one man can move the world. I said to Mary: 'I have seven children and a wife, and I am accountable to God for my children and my wife. But if it is the will of God and Yours, one man can move mountains.' But all went well. In the early years, I had dedicated to the Mother and Queen two hours a day of my time. When the children were already older and could work in the shop, I passed to dedicate myself fully to the Campaign. If God wants that someone performs a task, He also concedes the time to dedicate to his family."

Requests to receive the visit of the Mother Thrice Admirable picture were increasing. John remains in his store in the morning and, after delivering all orders, he leaves the counter to his wife or children to spend the afternoon by visiting the families to pray the rosary.

He begins to visit schools, hospitals and even prisons in the region.

John also organizes "missions" in the villages: he brings the picture in the villages and families gather to pray the Rosary. Then he preaches the Gospel, speaks about conversion and inquires about the material and spiritual status of families. So he leaves the village and returns a few days later, bringing material aid and also a priest to celebrate Mass, to confess and marry couples and to baptize children.And then the fruits begin to appear. Many families return to the Church; pilgrimages to the Schoenstatt Shrine are organized; Eucharistic adoration is established in several parishes; farmers build chapels in villages.

Development of the Campaign 
Over time, John cannot arrive alone to do more visits with the Pilgrim Image; then the Schoenstatt Sisters of Mary make copies of the pilgrim image, but in a smaller size to make it easier its transportation by other voluntaries, that visit thirty families each with them.

On 30 December 1972, he is ordained Permanent Deacon by Bishop Eric Ferrari. Deacon John Pozzobon is therefore put to severe hardship. At first, his work is not understood and it is often criticized. But he remains in obedience to his bishop and his parish priest.

"Sometimes, forlorn, I asked myself: What am I doing? I give up what is most dear to me, away from my family, alone in this way. Then I realized: I bring the Mother of God. The world needs heroism. And that gave me back the strength and courage to go on."

Commitment to the poorest 

Around 1955, Jean founded the "Noble Village of Charity," where he builds free homes for the poor who lived with his family in the streets: "There, I understood the meaning of the Via Crucis, the distress of the Christ that we can only imagine. The suffering of our brothers caused by those who make no effort to sacrifice for the other. I trust in the Divine Providence. I have never been a rich man, but I know God does not forsake those who serve his neighbor. Once, I received a small amount of money that made possible the purchase of a lot of land and the necessary building material. Generous people have contributed, hands were put to work, and in a few time the first houses were built."

After that, Pozzobon and a group of volunteers began to distribute clothes, food and educate the people of the Village of Charity to the work. They also planted fruit trees and flowers. Their objective was to help the poor to conquest dignity and self-respect.

"I wanted so much to change this world so dominated by materialism. Bring Jesus, bring His message, and that all became good and loved each other. I felt a lot of strength and joy, and I put myself at the disposal of the Mother to accept all the sacrifices she sent me. For love to this sacred image, I've had two thousand different beds in the darkness of the night, among the lilies of the fields and the woods. She always accompanied me in the long marches, crossing valleys and rivers, and when I was sitting by the road and said to her, 'Mom, I cannot stand it anymore!' When I passed by humiliations and hardships, she always accompanied me. With only my strength I could never have done all this.

Pozzobon's death and the continuation of his work 

On 15 June 1985, John offers his life in the Sanctuary for the flourishing of the Rosary Campaign. On the morning of 27 June 1985, Deacon John Pozzobon is deadly hit by a truck in the middle of a thick fog in Santa Maria while on his way to the Shrine of Our Lady of Schoenstatt to attend Mass, as he did every day.

The Pilgrim Mother Campaign, according to the wishes of Pozzobon, continues to flourish. It is now present in over 100 countries worldwide, in the six continents. Even in Antarctica there is a statue of Our Lady of Schoenstatt, in a scientific research station.

Recent data from the Campaign secretariat in Brazil indicates that today only in this country there are almost two and a half million families receiving the pilgrim image of the Mother Thrice Admirable, what represents one in every seven Brazilian Catholics.

Canonization process 
His canonization process was opened in 1994 in the diocese of Santa Maria. In May 2009 the diocesan phase has been completed and the case was sent to the Congregation for the Causes of Saints in Rome.

Its Roman phase began on 3 June 2009, just a week after the arrival of the more than 10,800 documents instructing the cause, which surprised its postulators, who expected a much longer await, between three months and one year for the reception of the case at the Vatican. Since then, John Pozzobon can be called "Servant of God".

Bibliography 
Uriburu, Esteban. A Hero Today, Not Tomorrow:  The Life of John Louis Pozzobon a Poor Pilgrim and Deacon, 1904–1985. Translated by Naomi Emiliani and Valerie Lewis. [s.l.]: Schoenstatt Publications USA, 1991. 126 p.

See also 

 Pilgrim Mother Campaign
 Schoenstatt Movement
 Fr. Joseph Kentenich

References

External links 
 Official website of the Schoenstatt Rosary Campaign in the USA
 On the footsteps of Jesus: short documentary about the life of John Pozzobon
 Video about the Schoenstatt Rosary Campaign
 The Schoenstatt Movement International website
 The Schoenstatt Cloud: material about Pozzobon and the Rosary Campaign

Brazilian Roman Catholic deacons
Brazilian Servants of God
1904 births
1985 deaths
People from Santa Maria, Rio Grande do Sul
Brazilian people of Italian descent
Road incident deaths in Brazil